Brian John Cooper (born August 19, 1974), is a retired professional baseball pitcher. He is currently the pitching coach for the San Jose Giants.

Pitching style
Cooper threw an 86-89 MPH four-seam fastball, a slider from 80-84 MPH, a 78-82 MPH sinker, a 79-82 MPH changeup, and an occasional 72-78 MPH curveball.

References

External links

1974 births
Living people
American expatriate baseball players in Canada
Anaheim Angels players
Baseball players from California
Charlotte Knights players
Edmonton Trappers players
Major League Baseball pitchers
San Francisco Giants players
Toronto Blue Jays players
USC Trojans baseball players